Friends, Comrades is a 1990 Finnish drama film directed by Rauni Mollberg. It was screened in the Un Certain Regard section at the 1991 Cannes Film Festival.

Cast
 Mikk Mikiver as Arno Jurmala
 Stina Ekblad as Lisa Jurmala
 Hannu Lauri as Jaunkahns
 Paavo Liski as Kaakamo
 Otto Ševčík as Manfred Horst
 Ain Lutsepp as Pavlovski
 Aulis Rosendahl as Superintendent Blom
 Tapio Aarre-Ahtio as Lisma
 Göran Schauman as Director Liljeroos
 José Martin as Colonel Camino
 Tuire Salenius as Ulla Kaakamo
 Ilkka Rosma as Younger Jopi Kaakamo
 Kare Eskola as Older Jopi Kaakamo
 Mikko Nousiainen as Merchant Pukki
 Walter Bacon as Kane
 Carmen Mikiver as Olga

References

External links

1990 films
1990s Finnish-language films
1990 drama films
Films directed by Rauni Mollberg
Finnish drama films